Oumou Kalsoum Touré (born February 18, 1988) is a Senegalese basketball player. She represented Senegal in the basketball competition at the 2016 Summer Olympics.

References

Senegalese women's basketball players
Basketball players at the 2016 Summer Olympics
Olympic basketball players of Senegal
1988 births
Living people
Senegalese expatriate basketball people in France
Centers (basketball)